Philip Audinet (1766 – 18 December 1837), was an English line-engraver.

Life
Descended from a French family which came to England in after the revocation of the Edict of Nantes, Audinet was born in Soho, London, and served an apprenticeship with John Hall. He was employed on portraits for Harrison & Co.'s Biographical Magazine and other works.

Audinet died in London 18 December 1837, and was buried in the church of St Giles in the Fields.

Works
He engraved Lear with the dead body of Cordelia, after Henry Fuseli, for John Bell's British Theatre, and portraits after pictures by Henri-Pierre Danloux, resident in England after the French Revolution. Among his later works are portraits of Sir Benjamin Hobhouse, 1st Baronet, and Sir William Domville, Bart., lord mayor of London, after William Owen, and an engraving of James Barry's unfinished portrait of Samuel Johnson, as well as the illustrations designed by Samuel Wale for the edition of Isaak Walton's Compleat Angler published in 1808. There is one plate in mezzotinto by him, a portrait of his brother, S. Audinet, a watchmaker. It is said to have been done for improvement when the artist was a boy, and to be the only impression that was taken off the plate.

See also
 William Young Ottley, Notices of Engravers, 1831
 Samuel Redgrave, Dictionary of Artists of the English School, 1878
 John Chaloner Smith, British Mezzotinto Portraits, 1878, i. 4.

References

1766 births
1837 deaths
English engravers
Artists from London